A vertex (plural vertices) in computer graphics is a data structure that describes certain attributes, like the position of a point in 2D or 3D space, or multiple points on a surface.

Application to 3D models

3D models are most often represented as triangulated polyhedra forming a triangle mesh. Non-triangular surfaces can be converted to an array of triangles through tessellation. Attributes from the vertices are typically interpolated across mesh surfaces.

Vertex attributes

The vertices of triangles are associated not only with spatial position but also with other values used to render the object correctly.  Most attributes of a vertex represent vectors in the space to be rendered. These vectors are typically 1 (x), 2 (x, y), or 3 (x, y, z) dimensional and can include a fourth homogeneous coordinate (w). These values are given meaning by a material description. In realtime rendering these properties are used by a vertex shader or vertex pipeline.

Such attributes can include:

See also
For how vertices are processed on 3D graphics cards, see shader.

References

Computer graphics